|}

Richard Alfred "Rick" Setter (born 12 November 1937) is a former Australian politician. He was the Country Liberal Party member for Jingili in the Northern Territory Legislative Assembly from 1984 to 1997. He was Government Whip from October 1989 to February 1991, Leader of Government Business from April 1991 to May 1994, and Chairman of Committees from June 1994 to August 1997.

References

1937 births
Living people
Members of the Northern Territory Legislative Assembly
Country Liberal Party members of the Northern Territory Legislative Assembly